Madan is an upazila of Netrokona District  in the Division of Mymensingh, Bangladesh.

Geography
It has 21,808 households and total area 225.85 km2. It is bounded by Atpara and Mohanganj upazilas on the north, Itna and Tarail upazilas on the south, Khaliajuri upazila on the east, Kendua upazila on the west.

Demographics
According to 2011 Bangladesh census, Madan had a population of 154,479. Males constituted 49.24% of the population and females 50.34%. Muslims formed 93.33% of the population, Hindus 6.59%, Christians 0.01% and others 0.08%. Madan had a literacy rate of 30.41% for the population 7 years and above.

As of the 1991 Bangladesh census, Madan had a population of 117,613. Males constituted 50.99% of the population, and females 49.01%. This Upazila's eighteen up population was 58,127. Madan had an average literacy rate of 18.7% (7+ years), and the national average of 32.4% literate.

Administration
Madan Thana was formed in 1917 and it was turned into an upazila in 1983.

Madan Upazila is divided into Madan Municipality and eight union parishads: Fatehpur, Gobindasree, Chandgaon, Kaitail, Madan, Maghan, Nayekpur, and Tiasree. The union parishads are subdivided into 84 mauzas and 114 villages.

Madan Municipality is subdivided into 9 wards and 11 mahallas.

See also
Upazilas of Bangladesh
Districts of Bangladesh
Divisions of Bangladesh

Gallery

References

Upazilas of Netrokona District